Bernhard Wilhelm Roth (born 13 November 1970) is a German experimental physicist.

Scientific career 
From 1992 to 1997 Roth studied physics at the Universität Bielefeld from where he obtained his diploma in physics. He received his doctoral degree (Dr. rer. nat.) in the field of atomic and particle physics at the Universität Bielefeld. From 2002 to 2007 her worked as assistant professor and group leader in experimental quantum optics at the Institute for Experimental Physics, Quantum Optics and Relativity Group at the Heinrich-Heine-Universität Düsseldorf. In 2007 Roth obtained his state doctorate (Habilitation) in experimental physics in the field of production and spectroscopy on ultracold molecular ions at the Heinrich-Heine-Universität Düsseldorf. From 2007 to 2010 he was associate professor and group leader at the Institute for Experimental Physics of the Heinrich-Heine-Universität Düsseldorf and from 2011 to 2012 center manager at the Centre for Innovation Competence innoFSPEC Potsdam of the Leibniz Institute for Astrophysics Potsdam (AIP) and the Universität Potsdam. Since 2012 he is scientific and managing director of the Hannover Centre for Optical Technologies HOT, an interdisciplinary research centre of the Gottfried Wilhelm Leibniz Universität Hannover. In 2012 Roth also obtained his state doctorate in physics at the Gottfried Wilhelm Leibniz Universität Hannover and in 2014 he was appointed extraordinary professor in physics at the Faculty of Mathematics and Physics of the Gottfried Wilhelm Leibniz Universität Hannover, see also. As director of HOT he is one of the coordinators of the International Master Program Optical Technologies: Photonics and Laser Technology (M.Sc.) at the Leibniz Universität Hannover.

Research 
The scientific activities of B. Roth are focused on applied and fundamental research in optics and photonics. This includes the development of integrated functional photonics and polymer-optical sensing, e.g., based on fibre-optic or planar concepts, laser spectroscopy, optofluidics, and analytics in the life sciences, optical technologies for multimodal imaging in medicine, information and illumination technology as well as digital holography. Furthermore, hybrid multi-physics and multi-scale numerical simulations for complex optical systems and algorithms for simulation inversion are investigated. Initial research fields include quantum optics and laser spectroscopy, in particular laser cooling of trapped atomic and molecular ions and high-precision laser spectroscopy of ultracold molecular ions, and low-energy atomic and particle physics., Roth is member of the Collaborative Research Center PlanOS - Planar optronic systems team, and one of the principal investigators (PI) in the Cluster of Excellence PhoenixD: Photonics, Optics, Engineering - Innovation Across Disciplines of the German Research Foundation DFG

Awards 
Roth is recipient of the prestigious Kaiser-Friedrich Forschungspreis 2018 (Kaiser-Friedrich Research Award 2018) for Photonic Technologies for the Digital Laboratory  for the project SmartSens together with Dr. Johanna-Gabriela Walter (TCI, Leibniz University Hannover) and Dr. Kort Bremer (HOT, Leibniz University Hannover). The prize was awarded for the development of novel smartphone-based optical sensing for medicine and the life sciences.

In 2021, Roth received the Kaiser-Friedrich Forschungspreis 2020 (Kaiser-Friedrich Research Award 2020) for Photonic Technologies in Environmental and Climate Protection  together with Dr. Ann-Kathrin Kniggendorf (HOT, Leibniz University Hannover) for the project OPTIMUS. The prize was awarded for the development of new optical systems for the online-detection of microplastics in the environment.

Publications 
 
 

As authour / co-author he contributed, for example, to the following monography:

References 

1970 births
Living people
Experimental physicists
Bielefeld University alumni